Guldasta may refer to:

Guldasta (2011 film), a Marathi film
Guldasta (2020 film), a Bengali film